EW90 is the name for German Reichsbahn ET 165 electric multiple units working for Polish State Railways (PKP) after World War II.

History

The German ET 165 units were built in the period between 1928 and 1936 to service Berlin S-Bahn lines. While many units of this type were destroyed during the war, 189 ET 165, ET 166 and ET 167 vehicles were stabled in Schweidnitz (Świdnica), which after 1945 became part of Poland. As part of German reparations 54 were taken over by the PKP. From 1951 to 1957 were refurbished in Lubań as EW90, EW91 and EW92 units to service SKM lines in the Tricity area of Gdańsk, Sopot and Gdynia. It was necessary to rebuild cars to change the power supply from third rail system into pantographs.

EW90 EMUs finished their service in 1976 when the power supply on SKM lines changed from 800 V. into 3 000 V.

Technical data
Each unit consisted of two cars: engine car and trailer. It was possible to connect four units in order to gain an eight car train.

GBM-700 type electric engines used in EW90, EW91 and EW92 units have four main poles and four commutation poles. Two-step reduction of engine excitation (up to 50%) is made by a short-circuit of parts of main poles. Engine cooling is done with a fan installed on the engines' shafts.

External links
 EW90 pictures gallery at Chester home page, URL accessed on May 4, 2007.
 EW90, EW91 and EW92 information at Pojazdy Komunikacji, URL accessed on May 4, 2007.

See also
Polish locomotives designation

Electric multiple units of Poland